Grabówka may refer to the following places in Poland:
 Grabówka, district of the city of Częstochowa
 Grabówka, district of the city of Tarnów
Grabówka, Lower Silesian Voivodeship (south-west Poland)
Grabówka, Kuyavian-Pomeranian Voivodeship (north-central Poland)
Grabówka, Kraśnik County in Lublin Voivodeship (east Poland)
Grabówka, Lublin County in Lublin Voivodeship (east Poland)
Grabówka, Parczew County in Lublin Voivodeship (east Poland)
Grabówka, Białystok County in Podlaskie Voivodeship (north-east Poland)
Grabówka, Zambrów County in Podlaskie Voivodeship (north-east Poland)
Grabówka, Łódź Voivodeship (central Poland)
Grabówka, Opole Lubelskie County in Lublin Voivodeship (east Poland)
Grabówka, Subcarpathian Voivodeship (south-east Poland)
Grabówka, Greater Poland Voivodeship (west-central Poland)
Grabówka, Częstochowa County in Silesian Voivodeship (south Poland)
Grabówka, Wodzisław County in Silesian Voivodeship (south Poland)
Grabówka, Kędzierzyn-Koźle County in Opole Voivodeship (south-west Poland)
Grabówka, Namysłów County in Opole Voivodeship (south-west Poland)
Grabówka, Warmian-Masurian Voivodeship (north Poland)

See also
 Grabówka Ukazowa
 Grabówek (disambiguation)